Halls Corner or Halls Corners is an unincorporated community located within East Brunswick Township in Middlesex County, New Jersey, United States.

The community was named for J. C. Hall, a local hotel owner.

References

East Brunswick, New Jersey
Unincorporated communities in Middlesex County, New Jersey
Unincorporated communities in New Jersey